Endless Light may refer to:

Endless Light (Anaghra Raocha) Zoroastrian calendar
Endless Light album by O'Brother
"Endless Light", song from Cornerstone (Hillsong Worship album)
"Endless Light", song by Decoded Feedback